St Margaret's Church is a United Reformed Church in Finchley, London.

References

External links

Finchley
United Reformed churches in London